Franklin High School is a public high school located in Stockton, California, United States. The school's colors are green and gold. Their school mascot is the yellow jacket. They are one of the many schools that have the I.B. program through the International Baccalaureate Academy. The school also has the federal program Junior Reserve Officers' Training Corps (JROTC). The principal is Gamal Salama.

Notable alumni
Chris Cash, former NFL player
Al Gross, former NFL player
Eddie Guardado, former professional baseball player (Minnesota Twins, Seattle Mariners, Cincinnati Reds, Texas Rangers)
Windrell Hayes, former NFL player
José M. Hernández, astronaut
George Knapp, journalist
Dave Oliver, former professional baseball player (Cleveland Indians)
Hallway Productionz, three-time grammy nominated music producers.
Lefty Phillips, Second Manager of MLB California Angels. (Now known as the LA Angels of Anaheim)
Webster Slaughter, former NFL All-Pro
Michael Tubbs, elected in 2016 as the youngest mayor in Stockton's history, and its first African-American mayor.
Chevelle Wheeler, a student in 1985, was a victim of the Speed Freak Killers.
Jim White, the most successful high school cross country coach.  Portrayed by Kevin Costner in the 2015 movie McFarland USA

References

External links
 Official website

High schools in San Joaquin County, California
Public high schools in California
1950 establishments in California